Prunus salasii, called carretero, carreto, cerezo, cereza or cereza montés in Guatemala, and sapoyolillo or zapoyolillo in Mexico, is a species of Prunus in the family Rosaceae. It is native to Chiapas in Mexico, Guatemala, Honduras and El Salvador. A fast-growing tree usually 9-15m, but reaching 35m, it is planted in Guatemalan ranches and parks as a shade tree. The resplendent quetzal favors it as a nesting site.

References

salasii
Flora of Chiapas
Flora of Central America
Plants described in 1932